The 1981–82 Minnesota North Stars season was their 15th season. Dino Ciccarelli, in his second season, scored 55 goals, a franchise record. Minnesota won their first division title, but lost in the first round of the playoffs to the Chicago Black Hawks.

Offseason

Regular season
Glen Sonmor took a temporary leave of absence in January 1982, leaving assistant coach Murray Oliver in charge for four games, three of which the North Stars won.

Playoffs
The North Stars lost in the first round to Chicago. The Black Hawks won the best-of-five series, three games to one.

Final standings

Schedule and results

Player statistics

Forwards
Note: GP = Games played; G = Goals; A = Assists; Pts = Points; PIM = Penalty minutes

Defencemen
Note: GP = Games played; G = Goals; A = Assists; Pts = Points; PIM = Penalty minutes

Goaltending
Note: GP = Games played; W = Wins; L = Losses; T = Ties; SO = Shutouts; GAA = Goals against average

Awards and records

Draft picks
Minnesota's draft picks at the 1981 NHL Entry Draft held at the Montreal Forum in Montreal, Quebec.

External links
 North Stars on Hockey Database

Minnesota North Stars seasons
Minnesota North Stars
Minnesota North Stars
Norris Division champion seasons
Minnesota Twins
Minnesota Twins